The College of Applied Science, Dhanuvachapuram  under Institute of Human Resources Development, affiliated to the University of Kerala is established in 1999. The college is situated to the east of Neyyattinkara in Trivandrum District.

The institution is in the forefront of imparting world class education to the youngsters.

Courses offered  

It Offers courses in Electronics, Computer science and Commerce. The number of students intake per year in the respective courses is given in brackets.

Organizations and clubs 
The following clubs and organizations are functioning in this college: 
Science and Environment Association (SEA)
Sports Club
Arts Club
National Service Scheme (NSS) unit
Placement cell

External links 
www.keralauniversity.ac.in
www.ihrd.ac.in

References 
"Kerala university".
"IHRD official website".
"Institute of Human Resource Development College of Applied Science, neyyattinkara".

Colleges affiliated to the University of Kerala
Educational institutions established in 1994
Universities and colleges in Thiruvananthapuram district
1994 establishments in Kerala